Margaret Lockwood is a former international lawn bowls competitor for England.

Bowls career
In 1977 she won the silver medal in the fours at the 1977 World Outdoor Bowls Championship in Worthing with Joan Sparkes, Joan Hunt and Mabel Darlington and also competed in the triples.

She won the 1976 pairs title and the 1974 and 1979 triples title at the England Women's National Championships when bowling for Oxfordshire, in addition to being runner-up on four more occasions.

References

English female bowls players
Possibly living people
Year of birth missing